Safar Beyk (also Romanized as Şafar Beyk; also known as Borj-e Safar Beg, Burj-i-Safar Beg, Qal‘eh-ye Şafar Beyg, Şafā Beyg, Şafar Beīk, and Şafar Beyg) is a village in Mishan Rural District, Mahvarmilani District, Mamasani County, Fars Province, Iran. At the 2006 census, its population was 91, in 18 families.

References 

Populated places in Mamasani County